Love Is the Only Soldier is an album by the Canadian singer-songwriter Jann Arden, released on September 9, 2003.

Track listing
"If You Loved Me" (Arden) – 3:51
"Not Saying Goodbye" (Arden, Broom) – 4:34
"Love Is the Only Soldier" (Arden, Broom) – 3:53
"Anna Rebecca" (Arden) – 5:00
"Four Feet Deep" (Arden, Gryner) – 3:47
"Only One" (Arden, Broom) – 4:08
"When You Left Me" (Arden) – 3:54
"Ruby Red" (Arden) – 3:25
"The Right Road Home" (Arden, Bentley) – 3:36
"Fighting for the World" (Arden) – 3:15

Personnel
Jann Arden – piano, vocals
Russell Broom – guitar, keyboards, omnichord
Tanya Kalmanovitch – violin, viola
Michael Lent – bass guitar
Repete – background vocals

Production
Producers: Jann Arden, Russell Broom
Engineer: Russell Broom
Assistant engineer: Misha Rajaratnam
Mixing: Russell Broom
Mastering: Doug Saks

Charts
Album – Billboard (North America)

References

External links 
 

Jann Arden albums
2003 albums
Universal Music Canada albums